Thomas Bennett (1620 – 1644) was an English politician who sat in the House of Commons  from 1641 to 1644.

Bennett was the son of Thomas Bennett, of Pythouse, Wiltshire. He matriculated at Hart Hall, Oxford on 13 October  1637 aged 17.

In 1641, Bennett was elected Member of Parliament for Hindon in the Long Parliament. He was disabled from sitting in 1644 and died in the same year.

Bennet was probably the father of Thomas Bennett,  MP for Shaftesbury.

References

1620 births
1644 deaths
English MPs 1640–1648